The Players Tour Championship 2011/2012 – Event 12 (also known as the 2012 FFB Snooker Open and the 2012 Arcaden Shopping Open for sponsorship purposes.) was a professional minor-ranking snooker tournament that took place between 15 and 16 December 2011 at the World Snooker Academy in Sheffield, England with the first three rounds and 6–8 January 2012 at the Event Forum in Fürstenfeldbruck, Germany from the last 16 onwards.

Matthew Stevens made the 82nd official maximum break during his last 128 match against Michael Wasley. This was Stevens' first 147 break. On the same day Ding Junhui made the 83rd official maximum break during his last 128 match against Brandon Winstone. This was Ding's third 147 break. This was the first time that two official maximum breaks have been compiled on the same day.

Stephen Maguire won his seventh professional title by defeating Joe Perry 4–2 in the final.

Prize fund and ranking points
The breakdown of prize money and ranking points of the event is shown below:

1 Only professional players can earn ranking points.

Main draw

Top half

Section 1

Section 2

Section 3

Section 4

Bottom half

Section 5

Section 6

Section 7

Section 8

Finals

Century breaks
 

 147, 133  Ding Junhui
 147  Matthew Stevens
 140, 101  David Gray
 139  Xiao Guodong
 137  Steve Davis
 134  Ricky Walden
 133, 127, 120, 113, 105, 105, 100  Mark Allen
 132, 111, 104  David Gilbert
 132  Stuart Bingham
 129  Nigel Bond
 123, 105, 101  Marco Fu
 121, 105  Stephen Hendry
 121  Mark Davis
 120  Joe Swail
 117, 102  Andrew Higginson
 115, 114, 111, 105  Stephen Maguire
 115, 106  Mike Dunn

 115  Zhang Anda
 114, 103  Jimmy White
 110  Ken Doherty
 108, 103  Ryan Day
 108  Tony Drago
 106  Barry Hawkins
 105, 105  John Higgins
 105  David Morris
 105  David Grace
 104  Ashley Wright
 103  Liam Highfield
 103  Paul Davison
 102  Mark King
 102  Michael Holt
 101  Stephen Lee
 100  Peter Ebdon

References

FFB Open
12
2011 in English sport
2012 in German sport